The chairman of the Cabinet of Ministers of Kyrgyzstan, formerly known as the Prime Minister of Kyrgyzstan chairs the Cabinet of Ministers of the Kyrgyz Republic.

Powers 

Until 2010, the president was in a stronger position than the prime minister in Kyrgyzstan, but after the 2010 constitutional referendum, the state transitioned to a parliamentary system, placing greater power in parliament and the cabinet at the expense of the president. This was reverted in 2021 after the Kyrgyz constitutional referendum.

History of the office 
Kubatbek Boronov was the acting prime minister from 16 June 2020, succeeding Muhammetkaliy Abulgaziyev after his resignation due to his cabinet's heavy corruption case.

Following election protests, Boronov resigned and was replaced on 6 October 2020 by Sadyr Japarov and again by Artem Novikov on 14 November 2020 to 3 February 2021.

List of officeholders

See also
List of leaders of Kyrgyzstan
President of Kyrgyzstan
Vice President of Kyrgyzstan

Sources

Government of Kyrgyzstan
Kyrgyzstan
Prime Ministers of Kyrgyzstan
1991 establishments in Kyrgyzstan